Tamiru Demisse is a visually impaired Ethiopian Paralympic athlete. He represented Ethiopia at the 2016 Summer Paralympics held in Rio de Janeiro, Brazil and he won the silver medal in the men's 1500 metres T13 event. In this event, all three runners finished with a faster time than Matthew Centrowitz Jr., the winner of the men's 1500 metres event at the 2016 Summer Olympics, who finished with a time of 3:50.00.

He was also one of the flag bearers during the opening ceremony of the 2016 Summer Paralympics.

References

External links 
 

Living people
Year of birth missing (living people)
Place of birth missing (living people)
Paralympic athletes of Ethiopia
Paralympic athletes with a vision impairment
Athletes (track and field) at the 2016 Summer Paralympics
Athletes (track and field) at the 2020 Summer Paralympics
Medalists at the 2016 Summer Paralympics
Paralympic silver medalists for Ethiopia
Paralympic medalists in athletics (track and field)
Ethiopian male middle-distance runners